Darragh Maloney (born 05 December, 1972) is an Irish sports presenter, working on Raidió Teilifís Éireann (RTÉ) radio and television.
Maloney joined RTÉ in 1995 from local Dublin radio station, FM104 and was previously the studio host of weekly show Premier Soccer Saturday on RTÉ Two. He has also commentated on two FIFA World Cups including the 2022 World Cup Final in Qatar, three European Football Championships and worked on numerous UEFA Champions League games as presenter and commentator.
Maloney is also a regular commentator on GAA for television and radio coverage on RTÉ. 
He has been one of the studio presenters for RTÉ's coverage of the last four Olympic Games.

References

External links
RTÉ Profile

Living people
Gaelic games commentators
Irish association football commentators
Irish sports broadcasters
RTÉ Radio 1 presenters
RTÉ television presenters
1972 births